Hagye Station is a station on the Seoul Subway Line 7 in Nowon-gu. The name comes from the name of the dong it is located in, and is named after its location at the lower parts of Hancheon.

Station layout

References

Metro stations in Nowon District
Seoul Metropolitan Subway stations
Railway stations opened in 1996